CASL Elite is an American amateur soccer team based in Raleigh, North Carolina, United States. Founded in 2009, the team plays in Region III of the United States Adult Soccer Association, a network of amateur leagues at the fifth tier of the American Soccer Pyramid.

The team plays its home games at WakeMed Soccer Park in nearby Cary, North Carolina. The team's colors are red, white, and black.

History
CASL Elite was founded in 2009 by members of the Raleigh-based Capital Area Soccer League, and was originally intended to be a loose group which would train with and play against the upper level Capital Area Soccer League youth teams, including the club’s CASL Chelsea teams that play in the US Soccer Federation Development Academy. However, when it became apparent that the wealth of talent playing for the team could compete on a more professional level, the team decided to enter the Lamar Hunt U.S. Open Cup in 2010

CASL Elite qualified for the 2010 tournament at the first attempt, winning their regional qualification group (which also featured NPSL teams FC Tulsa and Atlanta FC) before falling 4–2 to USL Second Division pro side Charleston Battery in the first round of tournament proper.

CASL Elite is closely associated with, but is not the same team as, the Raleigh CASL Elite amateur team which competed in the USL Premier Development League for many years, and was known as the Cary Clarets in its final competitive season in 2009.

Players

2010 USOC roster

Year-by-year

Head coaches
  Scott McGuinn (2009–present)

Stadia
 WakeMed Soccer Park; Cary, North Carolina (2009–present)

References

External links
 Official site

Soccer clubs in North Carolina
2009 establishments in North Carolina